Kilmallock was a constituency represented in the Irish House of Commons until 1800.

History
In the Patriot Parliament of 1689 summoned by James II, Kilmallock was represented with two members.

Members of Parliament

Notes

References

Bibliography

Constituencies of the Parliament of Ireland (pre-1801)
Historic constituencies in County Limerick
1800 disestablishments in Ireland
Constituencies disestablished in 1800